The Adrian and Blissfield Rail Road Company  is a Class III short line railroad which operates  of railroad track between Adrian and Riga, in Lenawee County, Michigan.  It was incorporated February 6, 1991, with company headquarters in Westland, Michigan. It also operates Lapeer Industrial Railroad, Charlotte Southern Railroad, Detroit Connecting Railroad, and Jackson and Lansing Railroad.

ADBF's railroad line is one of the oldest operating in the United States, having been originally built in 1834 by the Erie and Kalamazoo Railroad.

ADBF also operates a dinner train known as "The Old Road Dinner Train" in Blissfield, and a sister company operates in Charlotte.

Fleet
The ADBF fleet, as of January 2021, consists of the following 7 locomotives:

References

External links

https://web.archive.org/web/20061101183153/http://www.railroadmichigan.com/adrianblissfield.html
http://www.abrailroad.com
 https://web.archive.org/web/20130624081154/http://www.murdermysterytrain.com/blissfield_train.php

Railway companies established in 1991
Transportation in Lenawee County, Michigan
Michigan railroads
Switching and terminal railroads
1991 establishments in Michigan